DOS/V is a Japanese computing initiative starting in 1990 to allow DOS on IBM PC compatibles with VGA cards to handle double-byte (DBCS) Japanese text via software alone. It was initially developed from PC DOS by IBM for its PS/55 machines (a localized version of the PS/2), but IBM gave the driver source code to Microsoft, who then licensed a DOS/V-compatible version of MS-DOS to other companies. Kanji fonts and other locale information are stored on the hard disk rather than on special chips as in the preceding AX architecture. As with AX, its great value for the Japanese computing industry is in allowing compatibility with foreign software. This had not been possible under NEC's proprietary PC-98 system, which was the market leader before DOS/V emerged. DOS/V stands for "Disk Operating System/VGA" (not "version 5"; DOS/V came out at approximately the same time as DOS 5). In Japan, IBM compatible PCs became popular along with DOS/V, so they are often referred to as "DOS/V machine" or "DOS/V pasocom" even though DOS/V operating systems are no longer common.

The promotion of DOS/V was done by IBM and its consortium called PC Open Architecture Developers' Group (OADG).

Digital Research released a Japanese DOS/V-compatible version of DR DOS 6.0 in 1992.

History
In the early 1980s, IBM Japan developed two x86-based personal computer lines for the Asia-Pacific region, IBM 5550 and IBM JX. The 5550 reads Kanji fonts from the disk, and draws text as graphic characters on 1024×768 high resolution monitor. The JX extends IBM PCjr and IBM PC architecture. It supports English and Japanese versions of PC DOS with 720×512 resolution monitor. Both machines couldn't break dominant NEC's PC-98 in consumer market in Japan. Because the 5550 was expensive, it was mostly sold for large enterprises who used IBM's mainframe. The JX used 8088 processor instead of faster 8086 processor because IBM thought a consumer-class JX mustn't surpass a business-class 5550. It damaged buyer's reputations whatever the actual speed was. In another point, a software company said IBM was uncooperative for developing JX software. IBM Japan planned a 100% PC/AT compatible machine codenamed "JX2", but cancelled it in 1986.

Masahiko Hatori  was a developer of JX's DOS. Through the development of JX, he learned the skills needed to localize an English computer into Japanese. In 1987, he started developing the DOS/V during spare time at IBM Yamato Development Laboratory. He thought the 480-line mode of VGA and a processor as fast as the 80386 would realize his idea, but they were expensive hardwares as of 1987. In this era, Toshiba released the J-3100 laptop computer, and Microsoft introduced the AX architecture. IBM Japan didn't join in the AX consortium. His boss, Tsutomu Maruyama , thought IBM's headquarters wouldn't allow to adopt the AX because they requested IBM Japan to use the same standard as worldwide IBM offices used. In October 1987, IBM Japan released the PS/55 Model 5535 which was a proprietary laptop using a special version of DOS. It was more expensive than the J-3100 because its LCD display used a non-standard 720×512 resolution. Hatori thought IBM needed to shift their own proprietary PC to IBM PC compatibles. Maruyama and Nobuo Mii thought Japan's closed PC market needed to be changed and this attempt couldn't be done by IBM alone. In summer of 1989, they decided to carry out the development of DOS/V, disclose the architecture of PS/55, and found the PC Open Architecture Developers' Group (OADG).

The DOS/V development team designed the DOS/V to be simple for better scalability and compatibility with original PC DOS. They had difficulty reducing text drawing time. "A stopwatch was a necessity for DOS/V development", Hatori said.

IBM Japan announced the first version of DOS/V, IBM DOS J4.0/V, on 11 October 1990, and shipped out in November 1990. At the same time, IBM Japan released the PS/55 Model 5535-S, a laptop computer with VGA resolution. The announcement letter stated DOS/V was designed for low-end desktops and laptops of PS/55, but users reported on BBS that they could run DOS/V on IBM PC clones. The development team unofficially confirmed these comments, and modified incompatibilities of DOS/V. It was a secret inside the company because it would prevent sales of PS/55 and meet with opposition. Hatori said,

Maruyama and Mii had to convince IBM's branches to agree with the plan. In the beginning of December 1990, Maruyama went to IBM's Management Committee, and presented his plan "The low-end PC strategy in Japan". At the committee, a topic usually took 15 minutes, but his topic took an hour. The plan was finally approved by John Akers.

After the committee, Susumu Furukawa, a president of Microsoft Japan, could make an appointment with IBM Japan to share the source code of DOS/V. On 20 December 1990, IBM Japan announced they founded OADG and Microsoft would supply DOS/V for other PC manufacturers. From 1992 to 1994, many Japanese manufacturers began selling IBM PC clones with DOS/V. Some global PC manufacturers entered into the Japanese market, Compaq in 1992 and Dell in 1993. Fujitsu released IBM PC clones (FMV series) in October 1993, and about 200,000 units were shipped in 1994.

The initial goal of DOS/V was to enable Japanese software to run on laptop computers based on the IBM global standards rather than the domestic computer architecture. As of 1989, the VGA was not common, but they expected the LCD panels with VGA resolution would be affordable within a few years. The DOS/V lacked its software library, so IBM Japan requested third-party companies to port their software to the DOS/V. The PS/55 Model 5535-S was released as a laptop terminal for the corporate sector. They only had to supply a few major business software to the DOS/V.

In March 1991, IBM Japan released the PS/55note Model 5523-S which was the lower-price laptop computer. It was a strategically important product to popularize the DOS/V into the consumer market, and led to the success of subsequent consumer products such as the ThinkPad. However, the DOS/V itself sold much better than the 5523S because advanced users purchased it to build a Japanese language environment on their IBM compatible PCs.

In 1992, IBM Japan released the PS/V (similar to the PS/ValuePoint) and the ThinkPad. They were based upon an architecture closer to PC compatibles, and intended to compete with rivals in the consumer market. As of December 1992, the PS/V was the most selling DOS/V computer. In January 1993, NEC released a new generation of the PC-98 to take back its initiative. NEC advertised that the scrolling speed of the word processor Ichitaro on the PC-9801BX was faster than on the PS/V 2405-W. Yuzuru Takemura  of IBM Japan said, "Let us suppose the movement towards Windows is inevitability. Processors and graphics cards will become faster and faster. If the PC-98 holds its architecture, it never beat our machine at speed. Windows is developed for the PC/AT architecture. Kanji glyphs are also supplied as a software font. The only thing IBM have to do is tuning up it for the video card. On the different architecture, it will be hard to tune up Windows".In 1993, Microsoft Japan released first retail versions of Windows (Windows 3.1) for both DOS/V and PC-98. The DOS/V contributed the dawn of IBM PC clones in Japan, yet PC-98 had kept 50% of market share until 1996. It was turned round by the release of Windows 95.

Drivers
Three device drivers enable DBCS code page support in DOS on IBM PC compatibles with VGA; the font driver, the display driver and the input assisted subsystem driver. The font driver loads a complete set of the glyphs from a font file into the extended memory. The display driver sets the 640×480 graphics mode on the VGA, and allocates about 20 KB of the conventional memory for text, called the simulated video buffer. A DOS/V program writes the codes of the characters to the simulated video buffer through DOS output functions, or writes them directly and calls driver's function to refresh the screen. The display driver copies the font bitmap data from the extended memory to the actual video memory, corresponding to the simulated video buffer. The input assisted subsystem driver communicates with optional input methods and enables the text editing in the on-the-spot or below-the-spot styles. Without installing these drivers, the DOS/V is equivalent to the generic MS-DOS without DBCS code page support.
 $FONT.SYS – Font driver
 $DISP.SYS – Display driver
 $IAS.SYS – Input assist subsystem (IAS) with front end processor (FEP) support driver
 $PRN.SYS – Printer driver
 $PRNUSER.SYS – Printer driver
 $PRNESCP.SYS – Printer driver for Epson ESC/P J84

Versions

In 1988, IBM Japan released a new model of the PS/55 which was based on the PS/2 with Japanese language support. It is equipped with a proprietary video card, the Display Adapter, which has a high resolution text mode and a Japanese character set stored in a ROM on the card. It supports Japanese DOS K3.3, PC DOS 3.3 (English) and OS/2.

IBM DOS J4.0 was released in 1989. It combines Japanese DOS and PC DOS, which runs Japanese DOS as the Japanese mode (PS/55 mode) and PC DOS as the English mode (PS/2 mode). Although it had two separated modes that needed a reboot to switch between them, IBM Japan called it bilingual. This version requires the PS/55 display adapter.

The first version of DOS/V, IBM DOS J4.0/V (J4.05/V), was released in the end of 1990. The word 'DOS/V' was quickly known to Japanese computer industry, but the DOS/V itself didn't spread quickly. As of 1991, some small companies sold American or Taiwanese computers in Japan, but DOS J4.0/V caused some issues on PC compatibles. Its EMS driver only supports IBM's Expanded Memory Adapter. The input method doesn't support the US keyboard nor the Japanese AX keyboard, so it locates some keys at the wrong place. PS/55 keyboards were available from IBM, but it must be used with an AT to PS/2 adapter because AX machines (thus PC/AT clones) generally have the older 5-pin DIN connector. Scrolling text with the common Tseng Labs ET4000 graphics controller makes the screen unreadable. This issue can be fixed by the new /HS=LC switch of $DISP.SYS in DOS J4.07/V. "Some VGA clones did not correctly implement the CRTC address wraparound. Most likely those were Super VGAs with more video memory than the original VGA (i.e. more than 256 KB). Software relying on the address wraparound was very rare and therefore the functionality was not necessarily correctly implemented in hardware. On the other hand, the split screen technique was relatively well documented and well understood, and commercial software (especially games) sometimes used it. It was therefore likely to be tested and properly implemented in hardware."

IBM Japan released DOS J5.0/V in October 1991, and DOS J5.0 in December 1991. DOS J5.0 combines Japanese DOS and DOS/V. This is the last version developed for the PS/55 display adapter. DOS J5.02/V was released in March 1992. It added official support for the IBM PS/2 and the US English layout keyboard.

The development of MS-DOS 5.0/V was delayed because IBM and Microsoft disputed how to implement the API for input methods. It took a few months to make an agreement that the OEM adaptation kit (OAK) of MS-DOS 5.0/V provided both IAS (Input Assist Subsystem) and MKKC (Microsoft Kana-Kanji Conversion). Microsoft planned to add the AX application support into DOS/V, but cancelled it because its beta release was strongly criticized by users for lacking compatibility. Some PC manufacturers couldn't wait Microsoft's DOS/V. Toshiba developed a DOS/V emulator that could run DOS/V applications on a VGA-equipped J-3100 computer. AST Research Japan and Sharp decided to bundle IBM DOS J5.0/V. Compaq developed own DOS/V drivers, and released their first DOS/V computers in April 1992.

On 10 December 1993, Microsoft Japan and IBM Japan released new versions of DOS/V, MS-DOS 6.2/V Upgrade and PC DOS J6.1/V. Although both were released at the same time, they were separately developed. MS-DOS 6.2/V Upgrade is the only Japanese version of MS-DOS released by Microsoft under its own brand for retail sales. Microsoft Japan continued selling it after Microsoft released MS-DOS 6.22 to resolve patent infringement of DoubleSpace disk compression.

IBM Japan ended support for PC DOS 2000 on 31 January 2001, and Microsoft Japan ended support for MS-DOS on 31 December 2001.

Japanese versions of Windows 2000 and XP have a DOS/V environment in NTVDM. It was removed in Windows Vista.

PC DOS versions
PC DOS versions of DOS/V (J for Japanese, P for Chinese (PRC), T for Taiwanese, H for Korean (Hangul)):
 IBM DOS J4.0/V "5605-PNA" (version 4.00 – 4.04 were not released for DOS/V)
 IBM DOS J4.05/V for PS/55 (announced 1990-10-11, shipped 1990-11-05)
 IBM DOS J4.06/V (1991-04)
 IBM DOS J4.07/V (1991-07)
 IBM DOS J5.0/V "5605-PJA" (1991-10), IBM DOS T5.0/V, IBM DOS H5.0/V
 IBM DOS J5.02/V for PS/55 (1992-03)
 IBM DOS J5.02A/V
 IBM DOS J5.02B/V
 IBM DOS J5.02C/V
 IBM DOS J5.02D/V (1993-05)
 Sony OADG DOS/V (includes IBM DOS J5.0/V and drivers for AX machines)
 PC DOS J6.1/V "5605-PTA" (1993-12), PC DOS P6.1/V, PC DOS T6.10/V
 PC DOS J6.10A/V (1994-03)
 PC DOS J6.3/V "5605-PDA" (1994-05)
 PC DOS J6.30A/V
 PC DOS J6.30B/V
 PC DOS J6.30C/V (1995-06)
 PC DOS J7.0/V "5605-PPW" (1995-08), PC DOS P7/V, PC DOS T7/V, PC DOS H7/V
 PC DOS J7.00A/V
 PC DOS J7.00B/V
 PC DOS J7.00C/V (1998-07)
 PC DOS 2000 Japanese Edition "04L5610" (1998-07)

MS-DOS versions
MS-DOS versions of DOS/V:
 Toshiba Nichi-Ei (日英; Japanese-English) MS-DOS 5.0
 Compaq MS-DOS 5.0J/V (1992-04)
 MS-DOS 5.0/V (OEM, generic MS-DOS 5.0/V)
 MS-DOS 6.0/V
 MS-DOS 6.2/V (Retail, 1993-12)
 MS-DOS 6.22/V (1994-08)
 Fujitsu Towns OS for FM Towns (only late issues had DOS/V compatibility added)

DR DOS versions
DR DOS versions of DOS/V:
 DR DOS 6.0/V (Japanese) (1992-07), DR DOS 6.0/V (Korean)
 ViewMAX 2 (Japanese) (1991–1992)
 NetWare Lite 1.1J (Japanese) (1992–1997)
 Novell DOS 7 (Japanese)?
 Personal NetWare J 1.0 (Japanese) (1994–1995)
 (DR-DOS 7.0x/V) (2001–2006) (an attempt to build a DR-DOS/V from existing components)

Extensions
IBM DOS/V Extension extends DOS/V drivers to set up a variety of text modes for certain video adapters. The High-quality Text Mode is the default 80 columns by 25 rows with 12×24 pixels large characters. The High-density Text Mode (Variable Text; V-Text) offers large text modes with various font sizes. DOS/V Extension V1.0 included drivers for VGA, XGA, PS/55 Display Adapter, SVGA (800×600) and ET4000 (1024×768). Some of its drivers were included in PC DOS J6.1/V and later.
 IBM DOS/V Extension V1.0 (1993-01) includes V-Text support
 IBM DOS/V Extension V2.0 "5605-PXB"

See also
 Unicode
 List of DOS commands
 Kanji CP/M-86 (1984)
  (A Japanese magazine on IBM clones)

Notes

References

Further reading
 
 
 

DOS on IBM PC compatibles
1990 software
Discontinued Microsoft operating systems